The Protection of Trading Interests Act 1980 is an Act of Parliament passed by the British Parliament to counter American assertions of extraterritorial jurisdiction.

Introducing the Bill in the House of Commons, the Secretary of State for Trade, John Nott, claimed that its purpose was "to reassert and reinforce the defences of the United Kingdom" against attempts by the United States "to enforce their economic and commercial policies unilaterally on us" by "the most objectionable method" of "the extra-territorial application of domestic law".

The Act gives the Secretary of State for Trade the authority to "give to any person in the United Kingdom who carries on business there such directions for prohibiting compliance" with laws of a foreign state which control or regulate international trade in a way which damages British trading interests.

The Act also prohibits British corporations from giving documentation to a potentially hostile foreign interest and empowers British courts to seize the assets of any overseas power which impounded assets of British corporations.

The Act restricts the enforceability of judgments for multiple damages. Section 5 provides that British courts will not enforce a judgment for "an amount arrived at by doubling, trebling or otherwise multiplying a sum assessed as compensation".

References

United Kingdom Acts of Parliament 1980